Secret Brother is a 2015 gothic novel accredited to V.C. Andrews published by Pocket Books in paperback and by Simon & Schuster in hardback. The book is the sequel to Christopher's Diary: Echoes of Dollanganger.

Plot summary
The most unexpected Dollanganger story of them all, new from the author of Flowers in the Attic and Petals on the Wind—both now major Lifetime movie events.

A young boy suffers amnesia from a trauma he suffered in what feels like must have been another life. He’s adopted into a wealthy family—but what will happen when he learns the truth about his past?

References

External links
Secret Brother on the complete V.C. Andrews website

2015 American novels
Novels by V. C. Andrews
Simon & Schuster books
Pocket Books books